Kick is an Australian film produced and directed by Lynda Heys. It stars Russell Page, Rebecca Yates and Martin Henderson. It was released on 14 December 1999 in Australia.

Plot
Matt Grant is a champion rugby player at a private boys school. However he secretly wants to be a ballet dancer. Seizing an opportunity to audition for a local company's presentation of "Romeo and Juliet", he nonetheless fears what will happen to his reputation if the other kids in his school find out. Adding the practices to his already burgeoning schedule quickly starts to create problems with his friends, his teachers, his coach, his play director, and his ballet partner.

Cast

Production
Producer Steve Turnbull later complained the distributor took the director's original 115-minute cut and reduced it to 85 minutes.

Remake
In 2014 Turnbull and Heys announced plans to remake the film.

See also

References

External links

Kick at Oz Movies

Australian drama films
Films scored by Nerida Tyson-Chew
Films with screenplays by Stuart Beattie
1990s English-language films
1990s Australian films